Gerald Govan (born January 2, 1942) is a retired American professional basketball player. He played nine seasons in the American Basketball Association (ABA), from 1967 to 1976.

Born in Jersey City, New Jersey, Govan played high school basketball at Henry Snyder High School.

A 6'10" forward/center from St. Mary of the Plains College, Govan spent nine years (1967–1976) in the now-defunct American Basketball Association, playing for the New Orleans Buccaneers, Memphis Pros, Utah Stars and Virginia Squires.  He tallied 5,251 career points and 7,119 career rebounds, and he appeared in the 1970 ABA All-Star Game.

Govan is one of only six players to have participated in each of the original ABA's nine seasons of existence.  The others are Freddie Lewis, Byron Beck, Stew Johnson, Bob Netolicky and Louie Dampier.  Govan appeared in 681 regular season ABA games—4th all-time, and tops among players who never played in the NBA.

Nicknamed Go-Go, he was one of the rare basketball players who wore spectacles, black-framed glasses in particular. He explained, "I tried contacts, but they bothered me. These glasses take away from my aggressiveness. I'm afraid of breaking them because if I do I got to pay for them myself."

References

External links
Career stats at https://www.basketball-reference.com/

1942 births
Living people
African-American basketball players
American men's basketball players
Basketball players from Jersey City, New Jersey
Centers (basketball)
College men's basketball players in the United States
Henry Snyder High School alumni
Memphis Pros players
New Orleans Buccaneers players
Power forwards (basketball)
St. Louis Hawks draft picks
St. Mary of the Plains College alumni
Utah Stars players
Virginia Squires players
21st-century African-American people
20th-century African-American sportspeople